The 2016 Florida Gators football team represented the University of Florida in the sport of American football during the 2016 NCAA Division I FBS football season. The Gators played their home games at Ben Hill Griffin Stadium in Gainesville, Florida and competed in the Eastern Division of the Southeastern Conference (SEC). They were led by second-year head coach Jim McElwain. They finished the season 9–4, 6–2 in SEC regular season play to represent the Eastern Division in the SEC Championship Game where they lost to Alabama. They were invited to the Outback Bowl where they defeated Iowa.

Previous season

Going into the season, the Florida football program, under the new leadership of Jim McElwain, was largely thought of as undergoing a rebuilding process.  However, the team raced to a 6–0 start to the season, including an upset win versus then-no. 3 Ole Miss 38–10.  The following game at Missouri was the last game of 2015 for Will Grier, who was suspended the following week for taking a banned substance.  Treon Harris was called to lead the offense for the rest of the season.  With Harris as quarterback, the Gators won four out of their next five games, including 27–3 over rival Georgia and losing only to Western Division rival LSU 28–35.  With a 9–7 win against Vanderbilt, the Gators captured their first SEC Eastern Division championship since 2012, and earned a berth in the SEC Championship Game for the first time since 2009.
Florida's reenergized offense began to struggle toward the end of the season, as did the special teams.  The Gators needed overtime to defeat Florida Atlantic, who finished 3–9 on the season.  The Gators lost their final three games against rival Florida State, Alabama in the SEC Championship Game, and Michigan in the Citrus Bowl respectively, ending the season with a 10–4 record.

Florida's turnaround season earned McElwain the 2015 SEC Coach of the Year award.  McElwain was also in contention for the 2015 AFCA Coach of the Year award by virtue of winning the regional AFCA award.

Schedule
Florida announced its 2016 football schedule on October 29, 2015.  The 2016 schedule consisted of seven home, five away, and one neutral site games in the regular season.  The Gators were to host SEC foes Kentucky, LSU, Missouri, and South Carolina, and travel to Arkansas, Tennessee, and Vanderbilt.  Florida played Georgia in Jacksonville, Florida.

The Gators traveled to Arkansas for the first time since 2008.  The team hosted two of its three non–conference games, including Massachusetts and North Texas from Conference USA. They were set to play Presbyterian, from the Big South Conference, but the game was canceled to make room for the makeup game against LSU.  Florida traveled to Tallahassee for their final regular season game to play in–state rival Florida State from the Atlantic Coast Conference.

The game between Florida and LSU was postponed in advance of the arrival of Hurricane Matthew. It was originally scheduled for October 8 at Florida Field in Gainesville but was moved to November 19 at Tiger Stadium in Baton Rouge, replacing the previously scheduled game against Presbyterian.

Schedule source:

Rankings

Game summaries

UMass

The 2016 season kicked off with a prime time game against the UMass Minutemen, and was the first contest ever between the two schools.  Before the game, the Gators conducted a ceremony to honor Steve Spurrier, Florida's winningest football coach, by renaming the playing surface to Steve Spurrier–Florida Field.

Kentucky

Florida's last loss to Kentucky came in 1986.  Since then, Florida has defeated the Wildcats 29 years in a row, the longest active winning streak over an annual opponent. The all-time record is Notre Dame's 43-game winning streak against Navy from 1964 to 2006.  Last year's game at Commonwealth Stadium was closely contested.  Florida did lead 14–3 at halftime, although Kentucky was able to narrow the Gators' lead to 5 with two fourth quarter field goals before time expired.

North Texas

This was the second meeting between the two schools, with North Texas having won the only prior game, 20–12, in 1947.

Tennessee

Florida engineered a thrilling fourth quarter comeback in last year's contest.  Tennessee led 27–14 with 10:19 remaining in the game.  The Gators scored a touchdown with 4:09 remaining, and forced Tennessee to punt on the following possession.  The next drive ended when Will Grier, facing 4th-and-14 at their own 37-yard line, completed a pass to Antonio Callaway who raced to the end zone to tie the game at 27.  Jorge Powell made the extra point to give the Gators a one-point lead with 1:26 remaining.  On the ensuing drive, Tennessee's Aaron Medley was able to attempt a game-winning 55-yard field goal with 3 seconds remaining, but missed wide right.

Vanderbilt

Florida scored a touchdown in the first quarter of last year's game, but the extra point was missed.  Vanderbilt's rush leader, Ralph Webb, ran 74-yards for a game-tying touchdown, and Hayden Lekacz made the extra point to put the Commodores ahead 7–6 to go into halftime.  Every drive of the third quarter for both teams ended with a punt.  Finally with 3:10 remaining in the fourth quarter, Austin Hardin made a 43-yard field goal to put the Gators ahead 9–7.  The defense was able to hold off Vanderbilt on the ensuing drive, and the Gators were able to run off the final seconds to earn a 9–7 escape.

Missouri

Last year's game saw both teams score on their opening drives – Florida with a touchdown, Missouri with a field goal.  Florida scored a second touchdown in the first quarter, which after a scoreless second quarter gave the Gators a 14–3 lead over the Tigers.  The Gators scored again with their third and final touchdown of the game in the third quarter, and held the Tigers scoreless through the second half, earning the Gators a 21–3 victory and 6–0 start to the season.

Georgia

One of only two neutral-site SEC series (Arkansas–Texas A&M), Florida and Georgia have played a storied series since 1906 (though Georgia contends that they first met in 1904).  The game has been held in Jacksonville since 1933, only playing a home-and-home in 1994 and 1995 due to construction of Jacksonville Municipal Stadium.Florida drew first blood in last year's game when a muffed punt was recovered by Florida in Georgia's end zone at the end of the first quarter.  Florida entered the second quarter leading 6–0 after a muffed punt in the end zone, despite a blocked extra point.  The Gators added to their lead in the second quarter with two touchdowns, one from Harris–Callaway touchdown pass, the other from a 3-yard run by Kelvin Taylor following Georgia quarterback Faton Bauta's second interception and went to the locker room with a 20–0 lead.  Georgia scored the only points of the third quarter with Marshall Morgan's 26-yard field goal.  Georgia's Faton Bauta threw his third interception of the game in the fourth quarter, and Florida answered with a 3-minute touchdown drive.  Georgia's final drive of the game ended with a fifth interception for Faton Bauta, and Jim McElwain earned his first victory over the Gators' bitter rival in his first year.

Arkansas

South Carolina

Jim McElwain's predecessor Will Muschamp, in his first year as Steve Spurrier's full-time successor at South Carolina, returned to The Swamp for the first time since his 2014 firing from Florida.Last year, Florida 17–0 lead to enter the fourth quarter before Pharoh Cooper and Perry Orth caught touchdown passes from each other on consecutive drives.  On the ensuing drive, however, Florida was able to consolidate their squandered lead, and earned the game's final score as the Gamecocks were unable to answer.

LSU

Postponement and rescheduling
The 2016 Florida-LSU game was originally scheduled to be played at Ben Hill Griffin Stadium in Gainesville, on October 8. However, it was postponed on the Thursday before the contest due to the approach of Hurricane Matthew, which forced over one million Floridians to evacuate and caused almost $3 billion in damage as it moved up Florida's Atlantic coast on October 6 and 7.
Administrators at the two schools had difficulty coming to agreement on when and where to reschedule the game. The most likely date appeared to be November 19, when both schools were scheduled to play home games against non-conference opponents. However, LSU athletic director Joe Alleva refused to buy out the school's contract with South Alabama and play Florida in Gainesville as originally scheduled, stating that "We are going to have a home game on November 19th." The reluctance of Florida officials to agree to move the game to Baton Rouge cast doubt on whether the contest would be played at all, and led to accusations that the Gators were "scared" to play LSU, comments that head coach Jim McElwain and Gator players strongly refuted.

Eventually, the SEC ruled that neither LSU nor Florida could compete in the SEC Championship Game if they did not play eight regular season conference games as originally scheduled. With Florida vying for the SEC East title at the time, the school agreed to play LSU in Baton Rouge on November 19. In exchange, the 2017 LSU – Florida game was to be moved from Baton Rouge to Gainesville. Florida athletic director Jeremy Foley was displeased with both the process and the outcome, which resulted in the loss of two home games from the Gators' seven game home slate in 2016. "The conference office asked us to find a solution in working with LSU, yet LSU was never a true partner in our discussions", Foley said in a written statement. "The Southeastern Conference offered some other solutions and the LSU administration made it clear that they were unwilling to consider other reasonable options."

The game
The first half was a defensive struggle, with LSU leading 7–3. The Tigers drove the ball inside the Florida 5-yard line to start the second half but came away with zero points after a fumbled snap on a field goal attempt passed incomplete. The Gators took advantage of that LSU miscue by scoring a 98-yard touchdown pass from graduate quarterback Austin Appleby to freshman receiver Tyrie Cleveland down the sideline to take a 10–7 lead. After an exchange of punts, LSU scored a field goal to tie the game at 10. Florida then made a pair of field goals to take a 16–10 lead, the second field goal being set up by an LSU lost fumble on a kickoff return. After driving down the field with less than a minute left, LSU had first-and-goal at UF's 7–yard line with 50 seconds left. The Tigers picked up 6 yards on the first two plays, but nothing on their next two. Gators defensive back Marcell Harris and defensive lineman Jordan Sherit helped stop running back Derrius Guice at the goal line on the last play of the game, sealing the victory and setting off a Gator celebration in the end zone. Florida head coach Jim McElwain became the first coach in conference history to lead his team to the SEC Championship Game in his first two seasons.

Statistics

Florida State

The record-breaking crowd at The Swamp witnessed the lowest score Florida has ever attained in the Florida–Florida State series.  After a scoreless first quarter, Roberto Aguayo made a 45-yard field goal to give the Seminoles a 3–0 lead.  Sean Maguire connected with Jeremy Kerr to extend the lead to ten before the halftime break.  9:39 into the third quarter, Roberto Aguayo made his second field goal, this time from 51 yards to extend the Seminole lead to 13.  Florida's offense continued to be ineffective, and it took a safety midway through the fourth quarter to put the Gators on the board, trailing by 11.  However, Dalvin Cook ran for 15 and 29 yards for two touchdowns, the latter coming with twenty seconds remaining in the game, and the no. 14 Seminoles embarrassed the no. 10 Gators at home 27–2.

Alabama

Since defeating Alabama in the 2008 SEC Championship Game, Florida has lost the last five games against Alabama.  Florida trails 14–26 in the all-time series, but has a 4–4 record when playing the Crimson Tide in the SEC Championship Game.

Iowa

Personnel

Roster

Coaching staff

Players drafted into the NFL

References

Florida
Florida Gators football seasons
ReliaQuest Bowl champion seasons
Florida Gators football